Tomás Lanzini (born 3 June 1988) is an Argentine footballer who currently plays for Unión San Felipe in Chile as an attacking midfielder. His nickname is Tomy. At twelve, he began his career in the youth ranks of River Plate alongside his younger brother Manuel. However, Tomás left the Núñez-based club due to indiscipline, moving to Platense where he made his debut. Besides Argentina, he has played in Chile and Andorra.

After a season played in Argentina, he signed up with Chile's Unión San Felipe in 2011. He then moved to second-tier side Ñublense, where he won his first title and promotion after defeating Barnechea in a penalty shootout, being a key player that season.

Honours

Club
Ñublense
 Primera B Promotion (1): 2012

Notes

References

External links
 Tomás Lanzini at Football-Lineups
 

1991 births
Living people
Argentine footballers
Argentine expatriate footballers
Club Atlético Platense footballers
Unión San Felipe footballers
Ñublense footballers
Club Atlético Brown footballers
FC Encamp players
Chilean Primera División players
Primera B Metropolitana players
Primera Nacional players
Primera Divisió players
Primera B de Chile players
Association football midfielders
Expatriate footballers in Chile
Expatriate footballers in Andorra
Argentine expatriate sportspeople in Chile
Argentine expatriate sportspeople in Andorra
People from Ituzaingó Partido
Sportspeople from Buenos Aires Province